Cetrelia monachorum is a species of foliose lichen in the family Parmeliaceae. It was first described scientifically in 1930 by Alexander Zahlbruckner as a species of Parmelia. Husband and wife lichenologists William and Chicita Culberson transferred it into the genus Cetrelia in 1977. It is found in Asia, Europe, and North America.

References

Parmeliaceae
Lichen species
Lichens described in 1930
Taxa named by Alexander Zahlbruckner
Lichens of Asia
Lichens of Europe
Lichens of North America